The Preneuse was a 44-gun frigate of the French Navy, lead ship of her class, designed by Raymond-Antoine Haran and built at Rochefort. She served as a commerce raider at Île de France.

Career
In 1795, Preneuse was stationed at Rochefort under Captain Larcher. She was then transferred to the Indian Ocean station, commanded by Rear-Admiral Sercey.

In 1796, she was at Mauritius under Captain Ravenel, at Port-Nord-Ouest.

In March 1798, under Lhermitte, she ferried ambassadors from Mysore sent by Tippu Sultan to île de France to request help against the British. She left the diplomatic mission at Mangalore, and sailed to Batavia.

She was soon joined by the 22-gun corvette , which ferried Rear-Admiral Sercey. The squadron sailed to Surabaya, where a settlement was established. A small mutiny broke out when Preneuses crew refused to let go of the British flags captured at Tellicherry; Lhermitte had to personally confront the mutineers with his sabre to re-establish discipline. He then had a firing squad execute five of the mutineers.

After a short stay at Surabaya, Preneuse and Brûle-Gueule sailed for a three-month cruise, capturing 40 British merchantmen and participating in the Macau Incident. After returning to Subaraya, Sercey set his flag on Preneuse and the squadron sailed for île de France.

They arrived in May 1799, encountering the British blockade composed of three ships of the line, one frigate and one brig. The French ships reached Rivière Noire District, where they were joined by a number of coastal ships offering assistance. Preneuse and Brûle-Gueule anchored in the bay. They sent seven 18-pounders ashore and the French built an improvised fort to guard the entrance of the bay; it sustained a 3-week siege before the British retreated.

In August 1799, Preneuse departed for a patrol near Cape of Good Hope and Madagascar. On 4 September, she fought against five British ships. In September, she fought against a 64-gun ship of the line.

Preneuse also attempted to supply arms to the Graaff Reinet Republic of Adriaan van Jaarsveld. On the 20th, she sailed into Algoa Bay under Danish colours but was recognised. Preneuse exchanged cannon fire with the 16-gun ship-sloop  and the armed store ship Camel, before retreating.

On 9 October 1799, as Preneuse neared Good Hope, the 54-gun  encountered her and gave chase. After 22 hours, Jupiter gained on Preneuse, and the two vessels exchanged fire. Preneuse managed to outmaneuver Jupiter and rake her; the British then retreated to avoid being boarded, and managed to escape.

On 11 December 1799, as she returned to Île de France, Preneuse encountered the 74-gun , under Captain John Osborn, off Port Louis. Tremendous gave chase. As Preneuse closed to the land, the 50-gun , under Captain William Hotham, cut her escape route. While Preneuse was attempting to sail under the protection of the coastal forts at Baie-du-Tombeau, erratic winds drove her ashore. The British closed in and battered Preneuse, which Lhermitte then deemed lost. He had the crew abandon ship, while he stayed behind with his officers, struck the colours and scuttled the frigate. British boats attempted to recover Preneuse, but she came under fire from the coastal batteries and they abandoned the attempt.

The British took Preneuses officers to Adamant, where Commodore Botham treated them with courtesy. He released Lhermitte on parole the next day.

Citations

References
Naval History of Great Britain – Vol II
 

 
 
 
 
 
   « L'Hermitte (Marthe-Adrien, baron) » in Charles Mullié, Biographie des célébrités militaires des armées de terre et de mer de 1789 à 1850, Poignavant, Paris, 1852
 

Preneuse-class frigates
Age of Sail frigates of France
1794 ships
Ships built in France
Shipwrecks in the Indian Ocean